Vukovar: The Way Home is a Croatian drama film directed by Branko Schmidt. It was released in 1994. The film was selected as the Croatian entry for the Best Foreign Language Film at the 67th Academy Awards, but was not accepted as a nominee.

Vukovar: The Way Home is a drama that depicts the difficult life of Vukovar exiles during the 1991 war, who found refuge in wagons at a side railway station. The main characters of the film are a three-member family consisting of father Vinko, mother Jelka and son Darko, who hope to return home but eventually lose hope of returning.

See also
 List of submissions to the 67th Academy Awards for Best Foreign Language Film
 List of Croatian submissions for the Academy Award for Best Foreign Language Film

References

External links
 

1994 films
Croatian war drama films
Croatian-language films
Films directed by Branko Schmidt
Films set in Croatia
Yugoslav Wars films
Works about the Croatian War of Independence
Serbian-language films